Carlos Alvarez may refer to:

Politics 
Carlos Álvarez (American politician) (born c. 1950), former mayor of Miami-Dade County
Carlos Álvarez (Argentine politician) (born 1948), Argentine politician and former vice-president

Sports

Association football
Carlos Pérez Álvarez (1971–2006), Spanish football midfielder
Carlos Álvarez Nieto (born 1973), Spanish Paralympic footballer
Carlos Álvarez (footballer, born 1986), Spanish football striker for El Palmar	
Carlos Alvarez (soccer, born 1990), American soccer coach and former midfielder
Carlos Álvarez (footballer, born 2003), Spanish football midfielder for Sevilla

Other sports
Carlos Alberto Álvarez (born 1941), Argentine Olympic cyclist
Carlos Alvarez (American football) (born 1950), former American college football player
Carlos Álvarez (athlete) (born 1956), Cuban Olympic sprinter
Carlos Miguel Álvarez (born 1943), Argentine Olympic cyclist
Carlos Alvarez (racing driver), see 2014 MW-V6 Pickup Series season

Other 
Carlos Álvarez (baritone) (born 1966), Spanish opera singer
Carlos Alvarez (professor) (born 1944), accused Cuban spy
Carlos Felipe Álvarez (born 1983), Venezuelan actor and model
Carlos Manuel Álvarez (born 1989), Cuban writer